Hibbertia perfoliata is a species of flowering plant in the family Dilleniaceae and is endemic to Western Australia. It flowers from September to December or from January to March and has yellow flowers. The species was first formally described in 1837 by Stephan Endlicher from an unpublished description by  Charles von Hügel and Endlicher's description was published in his book Enumeratio plantarum quas in Novae Hollandiae ora austro-occidentali ad fluvium Cygnorum et in sinu Regis Georgii collegit Carolus Liber Baro de Hügel. The specific epithet (perfoliata) means "perfoliate".

This species grows in winter-wet places and near streams and swamps in the Jarrah Forest, Swan Coastal Plain and Warren biogeographic regions of south-western Western Australia and is classified as "not threatened" by the Western Australian Government Department of Parks and Wildlife.

See also
List of Hibbertia species

References

perfoliata
Flora of Western Australia
Plants described in 1837
Taxa named by Stephan Endlicher